Newlyweds is an Australian television sitcom that originally aired on the Seven Network for two seasons from 20 February 1993 to 16 March 1994. The series was created by Ian McFadyen and produced by David Taft. It was written by McFadyen, Mary-Anne Fahey and Graeme Farmer.

The show centres on young couple Allie Carter (Annie Jones) and Peter Roberts (Christopher Gabardi) as they embark on married life, with constant interruptions from their families and friends.

Cast and characters
 Annie Jones as Allie Carter 
 Christopher Gabardi as Peter Roberts 
 Sandy Gore as Irene Carter 
 Cathy Godbold as Jules Carter 
 Joseph Clements as Simmo 
 Sandie Lillingston as Marnie Phelps 
 Valentina Levkowicz as Bev Roberts 
 Denis Moore as Ross Roberts 
 Ross Williams as Eric Kaufman 
 Rod Mulliner as Kirby Hacker 
 Elisha Hall as Kelly 
 Jason Torrens as Duncan
 Matthew Turner as Matt (series 1) 
 Brendan McAlpin as Matt (series 2)

Production
A pilot for the series was produced in Melbourne by Crawford Productions in early 1992. Written by Ian McFadyen and Mary-Anne Fahey, it starred Lisa McCune, Katrina Foster, Richard Healey, Cathy Godbold, Rhys Muldoon, Stewart Faichney and Tenley Gilmore. In April 1992, Jacqueline Lee Lewis of The Sydney Morning Herald reported that Crawfords would re-shoot the pilot for Seven Network after recasting several roles.

Reception
Peter Holmes of The Sydney Morning Herald initially observed that "Newlyweds appears nothing more than Romeo and Juliet, badly done for the millionth time." Holmes admitted to openly laughing four times, especially at scenes involving Gore's "ice-bitch" character. The Ages Mark Lawrence thought the show was the most promising out of the recent locally produced sitcoms. He praised Gabardi's performance, saying that he has "good timing and clearly relishes his opportunity", while he found Jones was "a perfect match" for him. Like Holmes, Lawrence enjoyed Gore's performance as Irene, writing "If one must single out a star in this series, it's her. Such is the presence she creates."

Lawrence's fellow critic Geoff Slattery gave the show a more negative review, describing it as "a fatuous, demeaning, anti-intellectual series based on one sentence of concept: Newlyweds deals with problems familiar to all young couples.'"  Slattery felt that the show was full of bad stereotypes and had "no redeeming social values, perceptions, or understanding of either newlyweds, or the Australia of the '90s."

See also 
 List of Australian television series
 I've Married A Bachelor
 The Comedy Company

References

External links 
 

Seven Network original programming
Australian television sitcoms
1993 Australian television series debuts
1994 Australian television series endings
Television series by Crawford Productions